Cerithiopsis magellanica is a species of sea snail, a gastropod in the family Cerithiopsidae. It was described by Bartsch, 1911.

Description 
The maximum recorded shell length is 8.5 mm.

Habitat 
Minimum recorded depth is 112 m. Maximum recorded depth is 112 m.

References

magellanica
Gastropods described in 1911